Acanthosyris asipapote is a species of plant in the Santalaceae family. It is endemic to Bolivia.  It is threatened by habitat loss.

References

Endemic flora of Bolivia
Santalaceae
Vulnerable plants
Taxonomy articles created by Polbot
Plants described in 1997